Cupido carswelli is a small butterfly found in the West Palearctic that belongs to the blues family.  It is endemic to Spain. Cupido carswelli was described by 
Henri Stempffer as a form of Cupido minimus. The taxonomic status of the taxon carswelli is still unclear: depending on the sources, it is considered either a species in its own right or a subspecies of Cupido minimus, as at the time of its description. A recent morphometric analysis suggests that both taxa are conspecific, while a molecular barcoding study supports the opposite viewpoint, making carswelli appear to be closer to Cupido lorquinii (another species present in the Iberian Peninsula) than Cupido minimus sensu stricto. More in-depth molecular analyzes are considered necessary to resolve the relationship between these three closely related taxa.

Effect of Climate Change on Population
Current research indicates that the population of Cupido carswelli is declining due to climate change.

See also
List of butterflies of Europe

References

External links
 Biolib cz image]

Cupido (butterfly)